Vicio Latino is a Eurodance act from Madrid Spain. They started out as a studio act consisting of Miguel Angel Arenas (producer), and Pedro Vidal (also known as a producer as RT-1 (Ivan, Dj Ventura Mr Backer)).

In 1983 they released the single '¿Qué Me Pasa, Qué Me Pasa?' a Euro disco song that included different sections each with a different tempo, all based on synthesizers and electronic drums. It was a minor eurodance hit. The chorus was sung in Spanish by female vocalists, while male vocals were sung in an invented language imitating English language phonetics of the US Funk singers (somewhat like the later hit Asereje by Las Ketchup, or  previously Tom Tom Club's "Wordy Rappinghood").

In 1984 they released "¿Sabes qué hora es?", also by the Spanish subsidiary of Epic label, another eurodance song recorded in Doublewtronics studios in Madrid. The 12" Maxi contains "Sabes que hora es?" (12" version), "Horario disco", and "Sabes que hora es (versión casual)". It is sung in Spanish, English and Italian. Flamenco guitarist Raimundo Amador collaborated in this song. The song reproduces a three-section structure as in "¿Qué Me Pasa, Qué Me Pasa?" (a modern version of a three movement suite). One of them is the vocal version of the B side track "Horario Disco".

Discography 

 "¿Qué Me Pasa, Qué Me Pasa?" (Epic – 1983 )
 "¿Sabes Que Hora Es?" (Epic – 1984 )

External links

References

Spanish Eurodance groups